Lebedinsky Uyezd was an uyezd (district) in the Kharkov Governorate of the Russian Empire.

History 
This uyezd was created on April 25, 1780 by order of the Empress Catherine the Great. The administrative centre of the uyezd was the small town Lebedin. In September 1781 it received its own coat of arms.

The uyezd had two towns (Lebedin and Nedrigailov) and consisted of 27 volosts.

In January 1897, according to the Russian Empire Census, the population of the uyezd was 234,182.

By the Soviet administrative reform of 1923, the uyezd was transformed into the Lebedin raion.

Demographics
At the time of the Russian Empire Census of 1897, Lebedinsky Uyezd had a population of 178,144. Of these, 95.3% spoke Ukrainian, 4.4% Russian, 0.2% Yiddish  and 0.1% Polish as their native language.

References

Sources 
 Лебедин, уездный город Харьковской губернии // Энциклопедический словарь Брокгауза и Ефрона : в 86 т. (82 т. и 4 доп.). — Т. 33. СПб., 1896.

Uezds of Kharkov Governorate